Adrian King Arnold (April 27, 1932 - December 15, 2018) was an American politician in the state of Kentucky. He served in the Kentucky House of Representatives as a Democrat from 1973 to 2007.

References

1932 births
2018 deaths
Democratic Party members of the Kentucky House of Representatives